is a Japanese novelist from Hokkaido Prefecture. He won the 21st Mephisto Prize for Flicker Style, and the 20th Yukio Mishima Prize for 1000 Novels and Backbeard. His works have been translated into English, Chinese and Korean.

Kenzaburō Ōe, Kenji Nakagami and especially J. D. Salinger affected Sato's style.

Works in English translation
Novel
Dendera, trans. Nathan Collins and Edwin Hawkes (Haikasoru, 2015)
Short story
"Gray-Colored Diet Coke" (Faust 2, Del Rey, 2009)
This is a stand-alone short story and is also the first chapter of his Novel Gray-Colored Diet Coke. The title was named after Kenji Nakagami's Gray-Colored Coke.

Awards and nominations
 2001 – Mephisto Prize: Furikka Shiki (Flicker Style) (Novel)
 2005 – Nominee for Noma Literary New Face Prize: Kodomo-tachi Okoru Okoru Okoru (Children Shout Shit! Shit! Shit!) (Short story collection)
 2007 – Mishima Yukio Prize: Sen no Shosetsu to Bakkubeado (1000 Novels and Backbeard) (Novel)
 2007 – Nominee for Noma Literary New Face Prize: Gray-Colored Diet Coke (Novel)

Bibliography

Kagami family series
Novels
 (Kodansha, Tokyo, 2001)
 (Kodansha, Tokyo, 2001)
 (Kodansha, Tokyo, 2002)
 (Kodansha, Tokyo, 2005)
 (Kodansha, Tokyo, 2009)
Short story collection
 (Kodansha, Tokyo, 2013)
 (2004)
 (2005)
 (2005)
 (2005)
 (2004)
 (2005)
 (2005)
 (2012)
 (2005)

Standalone novels
Some of these books are not novels but collections of linked short stories.
 (Kodansha, Tokyo, 2002)
 (Shinchosha, Tokyo, 2007)
 (Kodansha, Tokyo, 2007)
Chapter 1:"Gray-Colored Diet Coke"
Chapter 2:"Red-Colored Moscow Mule"
Chapter 3:"Black-Colored Pocari Sweat"
Chapter 4:"Rainbow-Colored Diet Coke with Lemon"
 (Kadokawa Shoten, Tokyo, 2007)
 (Shinchosha, Tokyo, 2009)
 (Shinchosha, Tokyo, 2010)
 (Seikaisha, Tokyo, 2012)
 (Shinchosha, Tokyo, 2013)
, (Seikaisha, Tokyo, 2015)

Short story collection
 (Shinchosha, Tokyo, 2005)

Film adaptations
 Dendera (2011) directed by Daisuke Tengan, the son of Shohei Imamura

References

External links 
 J'Lit | Authors : Yuya Sato | Books from Japan 

21st-century Japanese novelists
Japanese male short story writers
Japanese mystery writers
Japanese crime fiction writers
Yukio Mishima Prize winners
Living people
1980 births
People from Chitose, Hokkaido
Writers from Hokkaido
21st-century Japanese short story writers
21st-century male writers